The following is a list of events affecting Philippine television in 2016. Events listed include television show debuts, finales, cancellations, and channel launches, closures and rebrandings, as well as information about controversies and carriage disputes.

Events

January
 January 1
 Charo Santos-Concio retires as president and CEO of the ABS-CBN Corporation and is succeeded by its COO, Carlo L. Katigbak, although she retains her role as chief content officer, president of ABS-CBN University, and executive adviser to the chairman Gabby Lopez.
 ABS-CBN Corporation launched their second high-definition cable channel, S+A, replacing Balls HD on Sky Cable, Destiny Cable and Sky Direct.
 GMA Network Inc. formally unveils the newest version of Lupang Hinirang (Philippine national anthem) aired during sign-on and sign-off of GMA and GMA News TV and the first screening and last full show of films in selected SM cinemas.
 January 2 – The ABS-CBN program It's Showtime launched Tawag ng Tanghalan.
 January 7 – Netflix was launched in the Philippines along with 130 countries, as part of the streaming service's global expansion.
 January 25 – President Benigno Aquino III approved the privatization plans of the government-sequestered television network Intercontinental Broadcasting Corporation (IBC-13) thru public bidding.

February
 February 1
 The ABS-CBN program On the Wings of Love apologizes to the Philippine National Police (PNP) on a complaint of using a police uniform on James Reid's character in a striptease scene with Nadine Lustre's character in the January 11 episode of the drama series.
 GMA Network's Wowowin returned to the airwaves now as a daily afternoon program.
 February 4 – FITE TV, a streaming service owned by Flipps Media Inc., was launched and became available in the Philippines.
 February 7 – Lucky Aces was named the first-ever Dance Kids grand champion held at the Newport Performing Arts Theater at Resorts World Manila.
 February 12 – The ABS-CBN program It's Showtime launched its all-female dance group known as the GirlTrends consisting of 21 talents from Star Magic, Pinoy Big Brother and other programs.
 February 21 – The first leg of the PiliPinas Debates 2016, a COMELEC-organized presidential debate held at the Capitol University, Cagayan de Oro and aired on GMA Network.

March
 March 1 – WWE Network, a streaming service owned by WWE, became available in the Philippines.
 March 15 – ABS-CBN News Channel was launched in high-definition as ANC HD on Sky Cable and Destiny Cable. It is the third high-definition cable channel of ABS-CBN Corporation after ABS-CBN HD and ABS-CBN Sports + Action HD.
 March 16 – ABS-CBN Corporation forged a partnership with Viva Films and Regal Entertainment for the broadcast rights of their respective films in ABS-CBN's free-to-air networks, cable channels, video on demand, and global assets. At the same time, ABS-CBN also signed a deal with Artikulo Uno Productions for the broadcast rights of Heneral Luna.
 March 18 – Sky Direct was launched as the third direct-to-home satellite provider in the Philippines.
 March 20 – The second leg of the PiliPinas Debates 2016, a COMELEC-organized presidential debate held at the Performing Arts Hall of the University of the Philippines, Cebu City and aired on TV5.

April
 April 10 – The Metro Manila leg of the PiliPinas Debates 2016, a COMELEC-organized first vice presidential debate held at the University of Santo Tomas, Manila and aired on CNN Philippines.
 April 17
 Maxine Medina, a graduate of the Philippine School of Interior Design with experience in designing residential condominiums and a model, is crowned as Miss Universe Philippines 2016 during the coronation night of the Binibining Pilipinas 2016 at the Smart Araneta Coliseum in Quezon City.
 The Harapan ng Bise: The ABS-CBN Vice Presidential Debate, a televised debate created and organized by ABS-CBN held at the ABS-CBN Compound.
 April 23 – Yohan Hwang, a Korean tourist based in Manila, bags the first Grand Touristar title of the reality competition show I Love OPM at the Newport Performing Arts Theater of Resorts World Manila in Pasay.
 April 24
 The third leg of the PiliPinas Debates 2016, a COMELEC-organized presidential debate held at the University of Pangasinan, Dagupan and aired on ABS-CBN.
 "Dalawang Letra", a song entry composed by Pinoy Dream Academy alumnus Davey Langit and interpreted by Itchyworms band was named as Himig Handog P-Pop Love Songs grand winner held at Kia Theater. This was aired on ABS-CBN's "Sunday's Best".

May
 May 1 – The ABS-CBN News Channel celebrated its 20th anniversary.
 May 9–10 – All Philippine TV networks had its special coverage of the 2016 elections.
 May 22 – Power Duo, composed of couple Anjanette and Gervin from Angono, Rizal, wins the fifth season of Pilipinas Got Talent, the grand finals of which were held at the Mall of Asia Arena in Pasay.
 May 27 – The Walt Disney Company, through its partner Globe Telecom, launched three separated video entertainment streaming service apps dedicated to Disney Channel, Disney Junior and Disney XD, replacing the three "Watch" apps of the same channels.
 May 29 – Shanne Dandan was hailed as Born to Be a Star Season 1 grand winner.

June
 June 30 – Jessy Mendiola, a television actress, is hailed as The Nation's Sexiest Woman in FHM Philippines' 2016 100 Sexiest List.

July
 July 11 – Alden Richards and Maine Mendoza were declared as The Most Beautiful Stars of 2016 of YES! magazine.
 July 17 – The all-male group Tres Kantos, of Bugoy Drilon, Jovit Baldivino, and former Tawag ng Tanghalan contestant Dominador Aviola, mentored by Erik Santos, were named the first winner as Grand Celebriteam of We Love OPM during the show's live finale at the Newport Performing Arts Theater, Resorts World Manila.

August
 August 21 – Alden Richards and Maine Mendoza, collectively known as AlDub, and Kathryn Bernardo and Daniel Padilla, collectively known as KathNiel, and other Kapamilya and Kapuso personalities and programs were among the winners at the 2016 PEP List Awards night held at the Crown Plaza Hotel.
 August 28 – Joshua Oliveros, coached by Lea Salonga, won the third season of The Voice Kids, the grand finals of which were held at the Newport Performing Arts Theater, Resorts World Manila.

September
 September 2 – Abigail Abion was hailed as KemboTitas grand winner on It's Showtime.
 September 26 – Jodi Sta. Maria and Bridges of Love were nominated for an International Emmy Award for Best Actress for her work in Pangako Sa 'Yo and an International Emmy Award for best telenovela respectively at the 2016 International Emmy Awards.

October
 October 4 – During the 30th anniversary celebration held recently at the Marriott Grand Ballroom in Pasay, DZMM announced the launch of the noontime national newscast Headline Pilipinas, airing exclusively on DZMM TeleRadyo anchored by veteran broadcast journalist Tony Velasquez, together with ABS-CBN Cebu's Leo Lastimosa and ABS-CBN Davao's Melanie Severino.
 October 15 – Names Going Wild from Halo Halloween 2015 was hailed as Clash of Champions grand winner on It's Showtime.
 October 22 – Team Anne, Amy and Joey hailed as the seventh anniversary (Magpasikat 2016, haPITOgether) champion on It's Showtime.
 October 29 – Joj & Jai Agpangan was hailed as COC - Clash of Celebrities Round 2 grand winner on It's Showtime.

November
 November 15 – Following the success of the Fight of the Century between Manny Pacquiao and Floyd Mayweather Jr. in May 2015, Solar Entertainment announced its broadcast of the 65th Miss Universe pageant on January 30, 2017. As stated in a press conference that day, it was broadcast live on three major television stations in the Philippines, ABS-CBN (who waived its contract with Solar to allow its free-to-air coverage of the pageant), GMA Network, and TV5 (who also broadcast the preliminary events and will handle the digital rights exclusively), with ETC, 2nd Avenue, Jack TV and CT as its main content provider for this historic pageant. Star World Philippines, the Philippine cable broadcast holder of the pageant (which sub-licensed the cable rights to the pageant with the over-the-air rights holder ABS-CBN), will pass on the rights on that year's pageant to Solar, the 66th edition of the pageant will eventually returned to the channel in November 2017, 1 month after its rebranding to Fox Life in October.
 November 19 – John Carlo Cruz emerged as the Ultimate Tough Model on It's Showtime.
 November 21 – The World Tonight celebrated its 50th anniversary of the longest-running English news program in the Philippines since its premiered in 1966.
 November 29 – Viu, a streaming service owned by PCCW Media Group, was launched and became available in the Philippines.

December
 December 10 & 11 – Niel Murillo, Russell Reyes, Ford Valencia, Tristan Ramirez and Joao Constancia were named as the winners of Pinoy Boyband Superstar, and they will officially be called BoybandPH.
 December 14 – Amazon Prime Video, a streaming and video on-demand service owned by Amazon, was expanded to over 200 countries and territories, including the Philippines.
 December 15 – The team of Parul Shah and Maggie Wilson, representing the Philippines, were held as winners at The Amazing Race Asia 5. The team of Eric and Rona Tai, also representing the Philippines, came in third place.
December 28 – Executive Secretary Salvador Medialdea issued Memorandum Circular No. 13, enjoining all departments, agencies, bureaus and offices of the government to support the hosting of the 2016 Miss Universe pageant in the Philippines.
 December 31 – MTV Pinoy was officially shut down after 2 years of broadcasting.

Debuts

ABS-CBN

The following are programs that debuted on ABS-CBN:

GMA

The following are programs that debuted on GMA Network:

TV5

The following are programs that debuted on TV5:

PTV

The following are programs that debuted on People's Television Network:
 January 16: Halo Halo House
 February 6: Entrep TV
 April 21: Hatol ng Bayan Electoral Primer 
 May 2: O Shopping
 July 3: Motorsiklo News TV (season 3)
 July 11: PTV News
 July 11: Good Morning Pilipinas
 July 24: Biyaheng Negosyo
 August 5: Business and Beyond
 August 6: Japan Video Topics 
 August 8: Dayaw
 August 27: ASEAN Spotlight TV
 October 9: Payo Alternatibo
 October 22: S.M.E. Go
 October 22: Tahor: Your Ultimate Gamefowl Show
 October 30: Tulay: Your Bridge to Understanding, Peace and Prosperity
 December 17: The Breaking Point

Other channels
The following are programs that debuted on other minor channels and video streaming services:

Returning or renamed programs

Major networks

Other channels

Programs transferring networks

Major networks

Other channels

Milestone episodes

The following shows made their Milestone episodes in 2016:

Finales

ABS-CBN

The following are programs that ended on ABS-CBN:

Stopped airing

 January 17: Kapamilya Weekend Specials (reason: Filler show for Pilipinas Got Talent (season 5) on Your Face Sounds Familiar Season 2's timeslot.)

GMA

The following are programs that ended on GMA Network:

Stopped airing

 January 17: Wowowin (Sunday edition)
 April 29: Wowowin (Weekday edition) (reason: series break)
 May 20: Shop TV (reason: Continues to air on GMA News TV)
 August 12: Dragon Ball Z (rerun) (season break)
 September 3, December 17: Kalyeserye (reason: season break)

TV5

The following are programs that ended on TV5:

Stopped airing

 January 22: Wattpad Presents (Weekdays edition) 
 May 27:  Rat-A-Tat (reason: Short break) 
 May 28: What's New Scooby-Doo and Taz-Mania (reason: Short break)
 May 29: Krypto the Superdog and Duck Dodgers (reason: Short break)
 June 4: Outcast (reason: Continues to air on Fox)
 August 5–21: Sofia the First (season 2), Little Einsteins and Sheriff Callie's Wild West (reason: Pre-empted by 2016 Summer Olympics)
 September 15: Shark Men (reason: Short break) 
 September 16: Randy Cunningham: 9th Grade Ninja (season 2)
 September 17: Krypto the Superdog and The Powerpuff Girls (reason: Short break)
 September 18: Wander Over Yonder, The 7D and Penn Zero: Part Time Hero (reason: Short break)

PTV

The following are programs that ended on People's Television Network:
 January 14: Personage
 February 7: Halo Halo House
 May 6: Hatol ng Bayan Electoral Primer
 July 8: Good Morning Boss, News @ 1, News @ 6 and NewsLife
 July 9: News @ 6 Saturday Edition
 July 10: The Weekend News
 July 31: Ating Alamin
 September 2: O Shopping
 September 16: Business and Beyond

Stopped airing
 December 30: PTV Sports (reason: dissolved, became a 5-minute segment of PTV News)
 December 31: Panahon.TV (reason: creation of PTV InfoWeather segment during PTV News; continues to air on Pilipinas HD on BEAM TV)

Other channels

Stopped airing
 February 19: Palibhasa Lalake on Jeepney TV (reason: Short break)
 March 1: O Shopping, Shop Japan and TV Shop Philippines on BEAM TV 31 (reason: Relocated as digital-only subchannels)
 April 2: Pieta on Jeepney TV (reason: Short break)
 December 31: Shop TV on AksyonTV

Networks

The following are a list of free-to-air and cable channels or networks launches and closures in 2016.

Launches

Rebranded
The following is a list of television stations or cable channels that have made or will make noteworthy network rebrands in 2013.

Closures

Awards
February: 2016 Adamson University Media Awards, organized by Adamson University (awarded to Mike Enriquez)
February: 2016 EVSU Student Choice Mass Media Awards, organized by Eastern Visayas State University
February 3: The Platinum Stallion Media Awards 2016, organized by the Trinity University of Asia
February 19: 3rd Gawad Bagani sa Kommunikasyon, organized by University of the East-Caloocan
February 22: 2015 Anak TV Seal Awards, organized by Anak TV Foundation
March 8: 2016 Hildegarde Awards for Women in Media and Communication, organized by St. Scholastica's College
March 10: 3rd UmalohokJuan Awards, organized by Lyceum of the Philippines
March 12: 2016 Paragala Central Luzon Media Awards, organized by Holy Angel University
March 19: Gandingan 2016, organized by College of Development Communication, UP Los Baños
April 8: 2016 Gawad Tanglaw Awards, organized by the University of Perpetual Help System Dalta Las Piñas
April 17: 2016 GMMSF Box-Office Entertainment Awards, organized by Memorial Scholarship Foundation
April 21: 12th USTV Awards, organized by the University of Santo Tomas
April 29: 24th KBP Golden Dove Awards, organized by the Kapisanan ng mga Broadkaster ng Pilipinas
June 30: 2016 Rotary Club of Manila Journalism Awards, organized by the Rotary Club of Manila
August 29: 2016 VACC Awards, organized by the Volunteers Against Crime and Corruption, held at the Malacañang Palace
September: 11th COMGUILD Media Awards, organized by the COMGUILD Center for Journalism
September 10: 6th Edukcircle Awards, organized by the International Education Circle ICCS
September 29: 2nd ALTA Media Icon Awards, organized by the University of Perpetual Help System DALTA
October 12: 38th Catholic Mass Media Awards, organized by the CMMA Foundation
October 23: 30th PMPC Star Awards for Television, organized by the Philippine Movie Press Club
December 2: 2016 PUP Mabini Media Awards, organized by the Polytechnic University of the Philippines
December 10: 2016 Anak TV Seal Awards, organized by Anak TV Foundation
December 10: 3rd Indieng-Indie Short Film Festival

Deaths

January
January 6 – Marnill "Kigoy" Abarico, reality show contestant (Pinoy Big Brother: Unlimited) (b. 1979)
 January 8 – German Moreno, TV host, actor, prominent starbuilder (b. 1933)
 January 9 – Cielito del Mundo, original host of Kapwa Ko Mahal Ko and Mahal, actress (b. 1935)
 January 24 – Ad Roel Alcober, station manager of ABS CBN Cagayan de Oro, ABS CBN Tacloban, Former Substitute anchor of TV Patrol Southern Mindanao (b. 1956)
 January 29 – Sabatini Fernandez, original co-host of Kung Kami ang Tatanungin, actor (b. 1930)

February
 February 4 – Uro dela Cruz, director, Bubble Gang (b. 1952)
 February 20 – Noel Perfecto, PTV-4 senior correspondent (b. 1947)
 February 29 – Wenn V. Deramas, writer, film and TV director of ABS-CBN soap opera programs. (b. 1966)

March
 March 6 – Francis Pasion, independent film and TV director, On the Wings of Love (b. 1978) 
 March 11 – Antonio Cabangon Chua, Nine Media Corporation/Aliw Broadcasting Corporation chairman (b. 1934)
 March 16 – Ben Aniceto, former vice president and general manager, ABS-CBN (1986–87) (b. 1933)

April
 April 14 – Rod Reyes, former vice president and general manager, GMA Radio Television Arts (b. 1935)

August
 August 20 – Lilia Cuntapay, actress (b. 1935)

September
 September 10 – Joy Viado, comedian (b. 1959)
 September 29 – Miriam Defensor Santiago, Senate of the Philippines (b. 1945)

October
 October 11 – Dick Israel, actor (b. 1947)

November
 November 21 – Blakdyak, singer, actor, comedian (b. 1969)

December
 December 18 – Bobby Guanzon, Filipino journalist and politician, cardiac arrest (b. 1948)

See also
2016 in television

References

 
Television in the Philippines by year
Philippine television-related lists